Great Egg Harbor may refer to the following locations in the U.S. state of New Jersey:
Great Egg Harbor River
Great Egg Harbor Bay
Great Egg Harbour Township, now known as Egg Harbor Township
Great Egg Harbor Bridge, a toll bridge carrying the Garden State Parkway over the Great Egg Harbor River